Ambato-Boeni is a district of Boeny in Madagascar.

Communes
The district is further divided into 11 communes:

 Ambato Ambarimay
 Ambondromamy
 Andranofasika
 Andranomamy
 Anjiajia
 Ankijabe
 Ankirihitra
 Madirovalo
 Manerinerina
 Sitampiky
 Tsaramandroso

References 

Districts of Boeny